Karen Snow is an American poet. Her work has appeared in the Beloit Poetry Journal, Chowder Review, Montserrat Review, Heartland, Michigan Quarterly Review, Lake Superior Review, ANON, Prairie Schooner, North American Review. Karen Snow is a pseudonym.

Awards and honours
In 1978, Snow received the Walt Whitman Award, for her book Wonders. This prize was awarded annually to a poet who had not previously published poetry in a book. Snow was 54 at the time of the award.

Works

Poetry

Novel
   re-issued in 1981 by Pinnacle Books.

Anthologies

Juvenile collection

References

Living people
American women poets
Year of birth missing (living people)
21st-century American women